Rekoa zebina, the Zebina hairstreak is a butterfly in the family Lycaenidae. It is found in Nicaragua, Guatemala and Mexico.

References

Butterflies described in 1869
Eumaeini
Butterflies of North America
Butterflies of Central America
Taxa named by William Chapman Hewitson